Matis Carvalho (born 28 April 1999) is a French professional footballer who plays as a goalkeeper for French Ligue 1 club Montpellier HSC.

Career
On 19 June 2019, Carvalho signed his first professional contract with Montpellier HSC. He made his professional debut with Montpellier in a 5–0 Ligue 1 loss to Paris Saint-Germain F.C. on 1 February 2020.

Personal life
Born in France, Carvalho is of Portuguese descent.

References

External links
 

1999 births
Living people
French people of Portuguese descent
French footballers
Footballers from Nantes
Association football goalkeepers
Ligue 1 players
Championnat National 2 players
Championnat National 3 players
Montpellier HSC players